The 1966 World 600, the 7th running of the event, was a NASCAR Grand National Series race held on May 22, 1966, at Charlotte Motor Speedway in Charlotte, North Carolina. Contested over 400 laps on the 1.5 mile (2.4 km) speedway, it was the 20th race of the 1966 NASCAR Grand National Series season.

Marvin Panch of Petty Enterprises would win his final NASCAR Grand National Series race while Gene Cline would retire from professional stock car racing after the race was over.

Background
Charlotte Motor Speedway is a motorsports complex located in Concord, North Carolina, United States, 13 miles from Charlotte, North Carolina. The complex features a 1.5 miles (2.4 km) quad oval track that hosts NASCAR racing including the prestigious World 600 on Memorial Day weekend and the National 500. The speedway was built in 1959 by Bruton Smith and is considered the home track for NASCAR with many race teams located in the Charlotte area. The track is owned and operated by Speedway Motorsports Inc. (SMI).

Final Results

References

World 600
World 600
NASCAR races at Charlotte Motor Speedway
World 500